The sixteenth season of Family Guy aired on Fox in the United States from October 1, 2017, to May 20, 2018.

The series follows the dysfunctional Griffin family, consisting of father Peter, mother Lois, daughter Meg, son Chris, baby Stewie, and the family dog Brian, who reside in their hometown of Quahog. The executive producers for the sixteenth production season are Seth MacFarlane, Richard Appel, Alec Sulkin, Steve Callaghan, Danny Smith, and Kara Vallow. Sulkin returns after a two-season absence as the new showrunner for the series, replacing previous showrunner Callaghan. Appel continues to serve as showrunner alongside Sulkin.

The season features guest appearances from Bill Maher, Sir Ian McKellen, Kristen Bell, Louis C.K., and Modern Family cast members Ty Burrell, Julie Bowen, and Sofía Vergara.

The season also marks the final appearances of Adam West and Carrie Fisher following their deaths, as well as the show's 300th episode ("Dog Bites Bear").

Episodes this season include: A three-episode arc where a seemingly offensive Tweet turns Brian into a social pariah ("The D In Apartment 23", "Petey IV", and "Crimes and Meg's Demeanor") which was inspired by the non-fiction book "So You've Been Publicly Shamed" by Jon Ronson, a Christmas Carol parody where Patrick Swayze's ghost shows Peter what will happen if he never gets his Christmas spirit ("Don't Be a Dickens on Christmas"), Meg becoming a problem drinker ("Crimes and Meg's Demeanor"), the Griffins pulling every TV trope and trick in the book in order to win an Emmy ("Emmy-Winning Episode"), Ian McKellen guest starring as a child therapist who has Stewie as a patient ("Send in Stewie, Please"), a send-up of Sherlock Holmes-style Victorian mysteries ("V is for Mystery"), Brian playing the stock market ("The Woof of Wall Street"), Quagmire losing his penis in an accident ("The Unkindest Cut"), Family Guy being reimagined as a sitcom that's been on TV since the 1950s ("Family Guy Throughout The Years"), and Peter meeting God again ("Are You There, God? It's Me, Peter"). The season includes the 300th episode of the series (“Dog Bites Bear”) where Stewie's friendship with Brian is nearly destroyed when he drunkenly tears apart his teddy bear Rupert.

As of season sixteen, the series' first-run cable syndication rights have switched from Adult Swim and TBS, who had premiered the first fifteen seasons, over to Disney-owned Freeform and FXX, who will continue to premiere new episodes on cable with the coming seasons. Freeform and FXX began exclusively broadcasting the first fifteen seasons starting in September 2021 when Family Guy officially went off Adult Swim and TBS.


Marketing 
Fox celebrated the series' 300th episode with a character customization website titled familyguyyourself.com in which users could create versions of themselves in the show's art style.

Episodes

References

2017 American television seasons
2018 American television seasons
Family Guy seasons
Family Guy (season 16) episodes